Eupithecia lanceata is a moth of the family Geometridae. It is known from most of the Palearctic realm, except for the south. The habitat consists of pine forests.

The wingspan is 16–20 mm. There is one generation per year with adults on wing from April to May.

The larvae feed on Picea abies, Juniperus communis and Larix decidua. Larvae can be found in June. It overwinters as a pupa.

References

Moths described in 1825
lanceata
Moths of Europe
Palearctic Lepidoptera
Taxa named by Jacob Hübner